Maria Bosi Igorov (born April 26, 1954 in Bistriţa) is a former Romanian handball player who competed in the 1976 Summer Olympics.

She was part of the Romanian handball team, which finished fourth in the Olympic tournament. She played all five matches and scored 13 goals.

References

1954 births
Sportspeople from Bistrița
Living people
Romanian female handball players 
Olympic handball players of Romania

Handball players at the 1976 Summer Olympics